Asesham  is a village in the Mannargudi taluk of Tiruvarur district in Tamil Nadu, India. It is spread over an area 902.7 hectares.

Demographics 
In 2011, Asesham had a population of 5,787 people. In 2001, it had a population of 3,796 people, of which 1,910 were female and 1,886 male, with a resulting sex ratio of 1,013 females to every 1,000 males. The literacy rate was 77.92% in 2001.

References 

Villages in Tiruvarur district